Evgeny Yurievich Ilnitsky (Russian: Евгений Юрьевич Ильницкий, born December 1, 1989; Kazakh SSR, Kazakhstan, Petropavlovsk — September 21, 2017; Ibid), known professionally as Shot, and previously First Shot was a Kazakh-Russian rapper. 

Ilnitsky died in a diabetic coma in September 2017, he was 27 years old.

Biography 
Evgeny was born on December 1, 1989, and lived until his last days in Kazakhstan, the city of Petropavlovsk.

He was brought up from childhood by his grandparents, the parents of his father, who died when Eugene was not even a year old. It so happened that fate separated Evgeny from his mother and older brother, but they saw and communicated from time to time, maintaining warm relations between each other. From an early age, Evgeny became interested in creativity and wrote his first poems, was interested in different genres in music. At the age of 13, I realized that rap is a suitable accessible way to convey important thoughts to people in my songs. The first track on the topic of drug protest was performed at a school event. I started to work thoroughly in 2005, but only in 2008 it became possible to upload tracks to the Internet. Evgeny was able to reach the hearts of listeners, having gathered a large audience of connoisseurs of soulful songs with meaning. He recorded not only the lyrics to the tracks, but also often created music from and to, starting with the minus, ending with mixing tracks independently, without the help of studios, at home.

The trackography includes about 700 solo and collaborative works, dozens of albums and several music videos.

In addition to his musical career, Evgeny received a secondary education, graduated from college with a degree in communications. But, the main activity on his life path remained music, which occupied almost all of his time. He has repeatedly implemented a tour with concerts in Russia, Ukraine and Belarus. Unfortunately, since 2015, Zhenya's health has sharply weakened, and he has become a frequent visitor to hospitals.

On September 21, 2017, Evgeny could not survive the second diabetic coma, and at about 11 a.m. on KZ he was gone.

Discography 

 20 Квадрат - Кропал EP Vol.1 (Fuck Records) (2008)
 20 Квадрат - Кропал EP Vol.2 (Fuck Records) (2008)
 20 Квадрат - Реминисценция (2008)
 Мортуарий (Shot & Тихий) - Том I - Шаг в пустоту (2008)
 Shot - Кто, Если Не Мы EP (Fuck Records) (2008)
 Shot - Хроника (2009), (Неизданное) 
 Shot - Вне Конкуренции EP (Fuck Rec.) (2009)
 Shot - Underground The Mixtape (2009)
 Shot - Reincarnation The Mixtape (2010)
 Shot - Не Надо Слов (2011)
 T1One & Shot - Час Пик (2011)
 T1One & Shot - Небо Под Ногами (The Mixtape) (2011)
 T1One & Shot - Бесконечность (2011)
 Shot - Лирика (Часть Первая) (2011)
 Shot - Лирика (Часть Вторая) (2011) 
 Shot - Лирика (Часть Третья) (2012) 
 S.H.O.T. (2012) 
 Гоша Матарадзе и Shot-Лучше уважай (2012)
 Shot - Под Номером 13 (2014)
 Shot - The Moon (ЕР) (2014)

Literature 

 Rossiĭskiĭ muzykalʹnyĭ ezhegodnik (in Russian). Intermedia. 1998.

References 

 Google named the most popular search queries of 2017 (Top 10 fastest growing rap artists on google).
 Interview on YouTube  
 Interviews on music sites

Kazakhstani musicians
Russian rappers
Disease-related deaths in Kazakhstan
Deaths from diabetes